Kierston Wareing (born 7 January 1976) is a British actress. Her first film role was the lead in Ken Loach's It's a Free World..., followed by a supporting role in Andrea Arnold's Fish Tank – which won the BAFTA award for ‘Best British Film’ and the Jury Prize at the Cannes Film Festival.

Her television roles include miniseries The Runaway, The Take, Luther, and The Shadow Line. She is also known for her roles in EastEnders, Hollyoaks and Rise of the Footsoldier.

Career
She starred in Ken Loach's film It's a Free World... as Angie, an ambitious recruitment agent. She has also played in Andrea Arnold's Fish Tank (2009) and Martina Cole's The Take. She has been nominated for one BAFTA award and three British Independent Film Awards.

She played the character Heather in Channel 4's Top Boy and joined the cast of BBC soap opera EastEnders in 2012, making her first appearance as Kirsty Branning on 25 December 2012. She left the show on 9 January 2014.

Wareing played Delilah in the television series The Bible in 2013. Wareing joined the cast of Channel 4 soap opera Hollyoaks in 2015 as villainess Ashley Davidson with her first episode airing on 7 September 2015. Ashley was killed by the unknown Gloved Hand Killer as part of a ten-month long storyline which saw the unknown assailant kill various villagers. Her last appearance was aired on 19 October 2015, during the 20th anniversary week of the show.

Filmography

References

External links

Yahoo Movies
Interview in The Independent
Article in The Daily Telegraph
From the official BAFTA website

Actresses from Essex
English film actresses
English soap opera actresses
English television actresses
Living people
People from Leigh-on-Sea
21st-century English actresses
1976 births